Mangeli (also Romanized as Mangelī) is a village in Baghak Rural District, in the Central District of Tangestan County, Bushehr Province, Iran. At the 2006 census, its population was 35, in 8 families.

References 

Populated places in Tangestan County